Pardubice main railway station (Czech Pardubice hlavní nádraží) is one of the largest railway stations in the Czech Republic, located about  west-south-west from city centre of Pardubice, and an important railway network hub.

Name
The complete name of the station in Czech is Uzlová železniční stanice Pardubice, hlavní nádraží, translating to "Pardubice railway junction, main station". It abbreviates to Pardubice hl. n.

History
Work on the railway connecting Prague and Olomouc started in 1842 and the line was finished in 1845. The construction was led by Jan Perner. A small railway station was opened on the same year, with four tracks, a roundhouse (výtopna) for eight steam locomotives and passenger hall covering two tracks. The building still exists and is used by the railway operator.

A line between Liberec and Pardubice was built during 1855–1859. In 1859, a new railway station was opened and used for both lines. A line between Pardubice and Německý Brod (now Havlíčkův Brod) was built during 1869–1871. Access to the railway turned a small town into a large industrial city.

In 1908, the station building was coupled with a glass hall over two tracks. In 1910, a locomotive repair shop was set up; it was rebuilt in 1924.

Factories in the city built industrial sidings to the main station: 37 lines had been constructed in 1908 and new ones were added after the war. Since the 1960s, this number dropped to 19 in 2000, and even these are not fully utilized.

Pardubice, a city with large petrochemical factories, was bombed several times during World War II. An air raid on 24 August 1944 damaged the station. All lines were shattered and the passenger hall was destroyed. After the war, repairs started and in October 1945 traffic was restored.

New station
Architects Karel Řepa and Josef Danda started to work on the new station in 1947. Their design was a single floor large passenger hall with complete infrastructure connected to a seven-story administrative building. During 1951–1960, a block of flats was added to the complex. The new station was opened on May 1, 1958.

Since 1956 the lines in Pardubice have been electrified and work on improving them still continues. Work on the international railway corridor from Děčín to Břeclav (part of a Pan-European corridor) going through Pardubice had started in 1993 and was largely completed by 2004.

The station today
The main railway station, operated by Czech Railways, is an important hub for both passenger and freight traffic. The station has connections to Prague, Brno, Vienna, Bratislava, Budapest and other cities and is served by InterCity, EuroCity, Pendolino and local trains. In station operates also LEO Express with comfortable trains to Prague, Olomouc, Ostrava and Košice and RegioJet.

After decades of use, the passenger hall became a rather dingy place where homeless people concentrate. Reconstruction of stations in Pardubice and in neighbouring Hradec Králové is planned as of 2005 with intent to make them more attractive to the public.

Small railway stations in Svítkov and Rosice nad Labem, districts of Pardubice, handle local traffic. A Railway museum in Rosice nad Labem, opened in 2005, documenting the history of railways in the region.

Provided services
(as of 2006)
 customer centre of Czech Railways
 restaurant, wine shop and several fast food stalls
 bookstore
 hotel in station hall 
 movie theatre in station hall 
 lounge for 1st class passengers

Connection with other transport
The central bus station of the city lies a short walk away. There is a taxi stand and a city bus stop in front of the station hall.

A direct line to Pardubice Airport  exists as well as a direct bus connection. A spur to Labe (Elbe) river port will be built in the future.

Services

References

External links
All texts are in Czech.
 History of railway in Pardubice, photos
 Unofficial website of the station (with up-to-date details)

Railway stations in Pardubice Region
hlavni nadrazi
Railway stations opened in 1845
Anton Jüngling railway stations
Railway stations in the Czech Republic opened in 1845